Lost Tracks is a compilation album by American new wave band Missing Persons, released in 2002. Compiled by former Missing Persons guitarist Warren Cuccurullo, it contains a selection of previously unreleased studio and live recordings.

Track listing
"Mental Hopscotch" (Acid Samba Remix) – 6:26
"Dark and Dangerous Guy" – 4:31*
"Bad Streets" (live) – 3:41
"Action Reaction" – 2:50
"Throw Money" – 1:49*
"Words" (live) – 4:39
"None of Your Business" (live) – 3:29
"Face to Face" (live) – 3:01
"Rock 'n' Roll Suspension (live) – 2:46
"Give" (live) – 5:03
"Hair and Kiss and Makeup" – 3:40*
"Dark and Dangerous Guy" – 4:21*
"Centerfold Girl" – 2:00*
"On Vacation" (live) – 3:03*

 unreleased songs recorded for the 2001 reunion

Personnel
Dale Bozzio - vocals
Terry Bozzio - synthesizer, guitar, drums, keyboard, vocals
Warren Cuccurullo - guitar, vocals
Patrick O'Hearn - synthesizer, bass, electric bass
Chuck Wild - synthesizer, keyboard

Missing Persons (band) albums
2002 compilation albums